Nathan Frank (February 23, 1852April 5, 1931) was a U.S. Representative from Missouri.

Born in Peoria, Illinois, Frank attended the public schools of Peoria and St. Louis and Washington University in St. Louis.
He graduated from Harvard Law School in 1871.
He was admitted to the bar and commenced practice in St. Louis in 1872.
He unsuccessfully contested the election of John M. Glover to the Fiftieth Congress in 1886.

Frank was elected as a Republican to the Fifty-first Congress (March 4, 1889 – March 3, 1891).
He declined to be a candidate for renomination in 1890.
Founder and owner of the St. Louis Star.
He served as delegate to the Republican National Convention in 1896.
He served as vice president of the Louisiana Purchase Exposition at St. Louis in 1904.
He was an unsuccessful candidate for nomination for United States Senator in 1910, 1916, and 1928.
He retired from the active practice of law.
He died at St. Louis, Missouri, April 5, 1931.
He was interred in Mount Sinai Cemetery.  His memory is enshrined by the Nathan Frank Memorial Bandstand in Forest Park, St. Louis.

Frank was Missouri's first Jewish congressman.

See also 
List of Jewish members of the United States Congress

References

1852 births
1931 deaths
Harvard Law School alumni
Republican Party members of the United States House of Representatives from Missouri
Jewish members of the United States House of Representatives
Washington University in St. Louis alumni